Elections to Nottinghamshire County Council took place on 4 June 2009, having been delayed from 7 May, in order to coincide with elections to the European Parliament.

In the previous election, held on 5 May 2005, the Labour Party won a majority with 36 out of 67 seats. The Conservative Party were second with 26 seats, and the Liberal Democrats had five. Following the 2005 election, there were three by-elections, which all saw swings against Labour. The Conservatives gained Hucknall and the Liberal Democrats Sutton-in-Ashfield North from Labour, and the Labour Party's majority in Mansfield East was reduced by nearly two-thirds.

Campaign
A key local issue was the planned extension of the Nottingham Express Transit tram system to Clifton and Toton, which was opposed by the Conservatives.

Results by District

Nottinghamshire County Council is made up of 67 seats in a total of 54 electoral divisions across 7 districts: Ashfield District, Bassetlaw District, Broxtowe Borough, Gedling Borough, Mansfield District, Newark & Sherwood District, and Rushcliffe Borough.

Ashfield District
(10 seats, 8 electoral divisions)

Hucknall

Kirkby in Ashfield North

Kirkby in Ashfield South

Selston

Sutton in Ashfield Central

Sutton in Ashfield East

Sutton in Ashfield North

Sutton in Ashfield West

Bassetlaw District
(9 seats, 9 electoral divisions)

Blyth & Harworth

Misterton

Retford East

Retford West

Tuxford

Worksop East

Worksop North

Worksop North East & Carlton

Worksop West

Broxtowe Borough
(10 seats, 8 electoral divisions)

Beauvale

Beeston North

Beeston South & Attenborough

Bramcote & Stapleford

Chilwell & Toton

Eastwood

Kimberley & Trowell

Nuthall

Gedling Borough
(10 seats, 6 electoral divisions)

Arnold North

Arnold South

Calverton

Carlton East

Carlton West

Newstead

Mansfield District
(9 seats, 5 electoral divisions)

Mansfield East

Mansfield North

Mansfield South

Mansfield West

Warsop

Newark & Sherwood District
(10 seats, 10 electoral divisions)

Balderton

Blidworth

Collingham

Farndom & Muskham

Farnsfield & Lowdham

Newark East

Newark West

Ollerton & Boughton

Rufford

Southwell & Caunton

Rushcliffe Borough
(9 seats, 8 electoral divisions)

Bingham

Cotgrave

Keyworth

Radcliffe on Trent

Ruddington

Soar Valley

West Bridgford Central & South

West Bridgford West

By-Elections between June 2009 – April 2013

By-elections are called when a representative Councillor resigns or dies, so are unpredictable.  A by-election is held to fill a political office that has become vacant between the scheduled elections.

1. Newark East - 17 September 2009

2. Mansfield South - 25 February 2010

3. Worksop West - 16 September 2010

4. Chilwell & Toton - 15 March 2012

5. Rufford - 20 September 2012

References

2009 English local elections
2009
2000s in Nottinghamshire